Chafika et Metwal ("Chafika et Metwal"," Shafika and Metwali "," Shafika wa Metwalli(y)" ("شفيقة و متولي") is a 1979 Egyptian drama/romance film starring Souad Hosni and Ahmed Zaki. It was directed and written by Ali Badrakhan from a story by Salah Jahin.[1]

Credits

music          = Fouad Al Zawaheri
montage        = Said Sheik
released       = 1979
run-time       = 2h.5 minutes
country        = Egypt
language       = Arabic

Plot
The film was based on a folktale about brother and sister Shafika and Metwally. Where the wayward sister (Souad Hosni) escapes her petty existence in a small Upper Egyptian village and moves to the city. Chafika's poverty finally takes her to acquire a bad reputation as a belly dancer and kept woman.

Badrakhan gave the story an unconventional socio-political edge by setting it at the middle of the 19th century, when depraved Egyptian Pashas stopped at nothing to increase their wealth and influence, even if it meant trading in their own people's lives and sacrificing others’ integrity.

Cast
 Souad Hosni as Chafika
 Ahmed Zaki as Metwal
 Mahmoud Abdel Aziz as Diab
 Ahmed Mazhar as Tarabishi Bek
 Gamil Ratib as Afandina
 Mahmoud El Guindi
 Ahmed Bedir
 Younes Shalaby
 Shafika and Metwally

Awards

"1980: "Tanit d'Bronze Award" for Aly Badrakhan. Carthage Film Festival, Tunisia."
"1980: "Golden Montgolfiere Award" for Aly Badrakhan. Nantes Three Continents Festival, France."
Shafika and Metwally

See also 
  Egyptian films of the 1970s
 List of Egyptian films of 1979
 Shafika and Metwally

References

" Cinemed, "

External links
"Chafika et Metwal at the Internet Movie Database "
"Chafika wa Metwally "
"معرض صور فيلم شفيقة ومتولى "

Egyptian romantic drama films
1979 films